The following is the final results of the Iranian Volleyball Super League (The Great Prophet Cup) 2006/07 season.

Standings

References 
 volleyball.ir 
 Parssport

League 2006-07
Iran Super League, 2006-07
Iran Super League, 2006-07
Volleyball League, 2006-07
Volleyball League, 2006-07